George Mullins (fl. 1763 – 1765) was an Irish landscape painter.

Life
Mullins, a landscape painter, was trained by James Mannin in the Dublin Society's Drawing School beginning in 1756. 
He was first employed in Waterford where he painted trays and lids for snuff boxes. 
He obtained, however, some success as a landscape-painter, and coming to London exhibited at the early exhibitions of the Royal Academy from 1770 to 1775.

He was hired by Lord Charlemont to paint decorative pictures for his Marino estate. 
Mullins was also employed as a sign painter and taught one of the premier future Irish landscape painters, Thomas Roberts.

Family
He married a young woman who kept an alehouse near Temple Bar, called the Horseshoe and Magpye, a place of popular resort. The date of his death is not known.

References

Attribution

Year of death missing
Irish landscape painters
18th-century Irish painters
Irish male painters
Year of birth missing